Jelenia Góra may refer to the following places:

Jelenia Góra, Kuyavian-Pomeranian Voivodeship, village in Gmina Cekcyn, north-central Poland
Jelenia Góra city in Lower Silesian Voivodeship, south-west Poland
Jelenia Góra, Podlaskie Voivodeship,  village in Gmina Sokółka, north-east Poland